Horoka Dam  is a rockfill dam located in Hokkaido Prefecture in Japan. The dam is used for power production. The catchment area of the dam is 256.3 km2. The dam impounds about 8  ha of land when full and can store 493 thousand cubic meters of water. The construction of the dam was completed in 1965.

References

Dams in Hokkaido